Concordia USD 333 is a public unified school district headquartered in Concordia, Kansas, United States.  The district includes the communities of Concordia, Jamestown, Aurora, Hollis, Huscher, Rice, and nearby rural areas.

Schools
The school district operates the following schools:
 Concordia Junior-Senior High School
 Concordia Elementary School

Closed schools
 Jamestown High School (closed)
 Concordia Middle School (closed)
 McKinley Elementary School (closed)
 Washington Elementary School (closed)

Concordia Junior-Senior High School

Concordia students attend the Junior-Senior High for grades 7-8 (junior high) and 9-12 (senior high).

Concordia Middle School
The Concordia district has both a "junior high" school and a "middle" school in the same district.  School districts normally have either a "junior high" or a "middle" school but rarely have both.  In Concordia, the middle school houses grades 5-6 where the junior high houses grades 7-8 (as well as grades 9-12 for the senior high in the attached building complex). At the end of the 2012-13 school year, Concordia Middle School closed.

See also
 Kansas State Department of Education
 Kansas State High School Activities Association
 List of high schools in Kansas
 List of unified school districts in Kansas

Gallery

References

External links
 

Education in Cloud County, Kansas
School districts in Kansas